Porbandar Lok Sabha constituency  is one of the 26 Lok Sabha (parliamentary) constituencies in Gujarat state in western India.

Assembly segments
Presently, Porbandar Lok Sabha constituency comprises seven Vidhan Sabha (legislative assembly) segments. These are:

Members of Parliament

^ by poll. 
Vitthalbhai Radadiya won Lok Sabha seat for Congress in 2009, but gave up the seat after he became MLA for Congress from Dhoraji after 2012 assembly elections. But he resigned from Congress immediately after those elections. And contested Lok Sabha by-poll of 2013 on BJP ticket and won. Dhoraji assembly by-poll in 2013 was won by BJP's Pravin Mankadia.

Election results

General Election 2019

General Election 2014

By Election 2013

General Election 2009

General Election 2004

See also
 Porbandar district
 List of Constituencies of the Lok Sabha

Notes

Lok Sabha constituencies in Gujarat
Porbandar